Sloosh was a form of cornbread that was popular during the American Civil War, especially among Confederate soldiers. Civil war historian Shelby Foote described it as a mixture of cornmeal and bacon grease to make a dough, snaked around a rifle ramrod, and cooked over a campfire.

See also
 List of maize dishes

References 

Unleavened breads
American breads
Maize dishes